The 2021 Busch Clash was a NASCAR Cup Series race that was held on February 9, 2021 at Daytona International Speedway in Daytona Beach, Florida. Contested over 35 laps, it was the first exhibition race of the 2021 NASCAR Cup Series season.

Format and eligibility
The race is 35 laps in length, and is divided into two segments, with the first 15 laps and the second 20 laps.  Fifteen laps is one fewer than the length of the first stage and three fewer than the second stage of the ensuing Daytona 400 km two weeks later on the same circuit.

Criteria for qualification the 2021 clash will be different as the race is open to drivers who won the Daytona 500, won a previous Busch Clash, or won a pole for a Daytona 500, all of these criteria require the driver to compete full time in the 2020 Cup Series season. The race is also open to the five 2020 Cup Series pole winners, 2020 Cup Series playoff drivers, 2020 Cup series race winners, and 2020 Cup Series stage winners, all drivers under those criteria do not need to compete full time in the 2020 Cup Series season to the eligible for the race. NASCAR has said the changed criteria for the clash was in response to the COVID-19 pandemic which has led to most races in the 2020 Cup Series season to held without qualifying.

Entry list

Starting lineup
The lineup was determined by random draw, with Ryan Blaney drawing the top spot.

Race
Under a clear night sky, the race began at 7:15 p.m., with Ryan Blaney on pole. The caution soon fell for dirt and debris compiling at the bus stop chicane. The competition caution came out on lap 15, with all 21 cars pitting for fuel and tires. Martin Truex Jr., who was leading when the competition caution came out, missed the last chicane and was sent to the rear of the field. By lap 28, he had retaken the lead, with a caution coming out shortly after for Cole Custer’s car catching fire after an engine issue. After the restart, Truex spun in a similar fashion to Kevin Harvick earlier in the race, bringing out the caution once more. The race restarted with Chase Elliott staying out and holding the lead. Tyler Reddick and Chris Buescher collided, sending the latter into Alex Bowman’s No. 48 car, however the race remained green. With a couple laps to go, Blaney caught up to and passed Elliott. Entering the frontstretch chicane on the final lap, Elliott dove inside Blaney, but they collided. Blaney spun while third-place Kyle Busch passed a slowed Elliott win the race, despite not having led any laps beforehand.

Race results

Media
FS1 covered the race on the television side; Mike Joy, Jeff Gordon and Clint Bowyer handled the call in the booth for the race; Jamie Little and Regan Smith handled pit road for the television side. Larry McReynolds provided insight from the Fox Sports studio in Charlotte.

Television

Radio

References

Busch Clash
Busch Clash
Busch Clash
NASCAR races at Daytona International Speedway